Wat Aranyik may refer to:

Wat Aranyik, Phitsanulok, a historic temple in Phitsanulok, Thailand
Wat Aranyik, Sukhothai, ruins of a 13th-century temple in Sukhothai, Thailand